Giovanni Manfredi (1324–1373) was lord of Faenza from 1341 until 13 September 1356, as well as of numerous other minor fiefs in Romagna.

He was born in Imola, the illegitimate son of Riccardo Manfredi, and fought for Mastino II della Scala against John of Bohemia. In 1351 he was hired by Bernabò Visconti in his war against Bologna and the Papal forces, and was excommunicated the following year.

In 1356, after a long resistance together with his ally Francesco II Ordelaffi of Forlì, he was forced to surrender Faenza to the Papal commander, Cardinal Gil de Albornoz. In 1361 he rebelled again, but his conjures to conquer Faenza and Imola were discovered.

He died at Pistoia in 1373.

External links
Page at www.condottieridiventura.it 

1324 births
1373 deaths
People from Imola
People excommunicated by the Catholic Church
14th-century condottieri
Giovanni
Lords of Faenza